In geology and geomorphology, a valley created by erosion and with little or no sympathy for bedrock structure is labelled an epigenetic valley. Epigenetic valleys are inherited landforms. Arthur Holmes lists the radial valleys of the Lake District in England as examples of epigenetic valleys.

Sources

Fluvial geomorphology
River morphology